Saraha Georget Rabeharisoa (born May 1, 1970 in Antananarivo, Madagascar) is a  Malagasy politician and president of the Madagascar Green Party. She was a presidential candidate in the Malagasy presidential election in 2013.

Biography 
Mother of three children, Saraha Georget Rabeharisoa was born in Antananarivo, Madagascar in 1970. Her father, the late Rabeharisoa Samuel, was a public works engineer. Her mother, Raherivololona Henriette, is a doctor. She had her basic education (primary and secondary) in a Catholic school in the capital, Collège Saint Antoine, until obtaining a baccalaureate. She left Madagascar after college to continue her studies in France. In 1994, she obtained a master's degree in Internal Public Law at the University of Aix-en-Provence . In 1995 she continued with a graduate degree in Tax Administration at the Paris-Dauphine University.

Career 
At the end of her university studies, Saraha Georget Rabeharisoa returned to Madagascar to contribute to the development of the country. She began a teaching career then turned to sole-proprietorship by creating a transit and maritime consignment company.

References

1970 births
Living people
Madagascar Green Party politicians
People from Antananarivo
Paris Dauphine University alumni
21st-century Malagasy women politicians
21st-century Malagasy politicians